P8, P-8, P.8, or P 8 may refer to:

In transportation or aviation
 Boeing XP-8, 1920s US prototype biplane
 Bowin P8, Formula 5000 and Formula 2 race cars
 P-8 Poseidon, an anti-submarine warfare and maritime patrol aircraft
 Former Pantanal Linhas Aéreas, Brazilian airline with IATA code P8
 Piaggio P.8, a 1928 Italian floatplane
 Prussian P 8, a German locomotive, 1906-1923

In technology
 FileNet P8, system development framework
 Huawei P8, phablet
 Sony Cyber-shot DSC-P8, camera

In other fields
 Heckler & Koch P8, a 9 mm pistol
 Luger P08, a 9mm  pistol
 P8 abbreviation for octave interval
 P8, Political Eight, or "G7+1", see G8
 P8 Group of  pension funds
 , a hypothetical allotrope of phosphorus

See also
 Pate (disambiguation)